The 1998 European Archery Championships is  the 15th edition of the European Archery Championships. The event was held in Boé/Agen, France from 17 to 23 August, 1998.

Medal table

Medal summary

Recurve

Compound

References

External links
 Results

European Archery Championships
1998 in archery
International archery competitions hosted by France
1998 in European sport